Dalmatia is a census-designated place located in Lower Mahanoy Township, Northumberland County in the state of Pennsylvania.  The community is located along Pennsylvania Route 147 in southwestern Northumberland County, along the Susquehanna River.  As of the 2010 census the population was 488 residents.

Dalmatia, Pennsylvania, was named for the historical region of Dalmatia.

Demographics

References

Census-designated places in Northumberland County, Pennsylvania
Census-designated places in Pennsylvania